Joseph Hii Teck Kwong (born 25 June 1965) is a Malaysian prelate of the Roman Catholic Church who has been serving as bishop of the Diocese of Sibu since 2012. He served as an auxiliary bishop of the same diocese from 2008 to 2012.

Biography

Early life 
Hii entered St. Peter's major seminary in Kuching, Sarawak, in 1986, to study philosophy and theology.

Priesthood 
Hii was ordained a priest on 25 March 1993 at Sacred Heart Cathedral, Sibu. In 1999, he obtained a licentiate in spiritual theology from the Pontifical Theological Faculty Teresianum in Rome, Italy.

Auxiliary Bishop of Sibu 
At the age of 43, Hii was appointed titular bishop of Castellum Medianum and auxiliary bishop of the Diocese of Sibu on 25 January 2008, by Pope Benedict XVI. He received his episcopal consecration on 1 May 2008, from Archbishop Salvatore Pennacchio. Bishop Dominic Su Haw Chiu and Archbishop John Ha Tiong Hock served as co-consecrators.

Bishop of Sibu 
On 24 December 2011, Pope Benedict XVI accepted the resignation of Bishop Dominic Su Haw Chiu of Diocese of Sibu and named Hii to succeed him. Hii was installed as the second bishop of the Diocese of Sibu by his predecessor on 15 February 2012, at the Sacred Heart Cathedral in Sibu.

References

External links 

Short Biography of Bishop Joseph Hii
Photo Gallery of Bishop Joseph Hii

 

}
}
}

1965 births
Living people
Bishops appointed by Pope Benedict XVI
21st-century Roman Catholic bishops in Malaysia
People from Sarawak
Malaysian people of Chinese descent
Malaysian Christians